Markus Opatril (born 6 May 1965) is an Austrian freestyle swimmer. He competed in three events at the 1988 Summer Olympics.

References

External links
 

1965 births
Living people
Austrian male freestyle swimmers
Olympic swimmers of Austria
Swimmers at the 1988 Summer Olympics
Sportspeople from Innsbruck